A safeguard is a tool of international trade.

Safeguard may also refer to some of the following:

 A combined understanding of child safeguarding and the similar safeguarding of vulnerable adults (broadly construed).

In the military 
 Safeguard (military), a detachment, guard or detail or a written order for the protection of enemy or neutral persons, places, or property in wartime, pledging respect for that person or property by a nation's armed forces.
 Safeguard Program, a US anti-ballistic missile system
 USNS Safeguard (T-ARS-50), lead ship of the US Navy's current class of marine salvage ships

In government and law 
 Safeguards Rule, promulgated under the Gramm-Leach-Bliley Act, requires financial institutions to have a security plan to protect the confidentiality and integrity of personal consumer information
 Safeguarding (planning law) is a process by which a proposed route or location of a infrastructure project is protected from conflicting development

In software 
 Trend Micro SafeGuard, a secure browser for Windows 8 by Trend Micro
 360 Safeguard, a Chinese computer security program for Windows

Other uses 
 Safeguard Coaches, a bus and coach operator based in Guildford, England
 Safeguard (magazine), a New Zealand occupational health and safety bi-monthly
 Safeguard Scientifics, a venture capital firm
 Safeguard (soap), a brand of bar soap sold in the United States
 Safeguard (Transformers), a Mini-Con in the Transformers: Cybertron toy line
 IAEA safeguards, a system of inspection and verification of the peaceful uses of nuclear materials